Jaime Camps (28 February 1896 – 3 August 1921) was a Spanish sprinter. He competed in the men's 100 metres at the 1920 Summer Olympics. He was killed in action during the Battle of Annual.

References

External links
 

1896 births
1921 deaths
Athletes (track and field) at the 1920 Summer Olympics
Spanish male sprinters
Olympic athletes of Spain
Sportspeople from San Sebastián
Spanish military personnel killed in action
People of the Rif War
Athletes from the Basque Country (autonomous community)
19th-century Spanish people
20th-century Spanish people
Olympians killed in warfare